The Primavera Rosa was an elite women's professional one-day road bicycle race held between 1999 and 2005 in Liguria, Italy as part of the UCI Women's Road Cycling World Cup. The race was a female version of Milan–San Remo being organised on the same day and finishing in Sanremo shortly before the men but racing over a shorter distance, hence the start was in Varazze. The 2006 edition was initially planned but cancelled before the event.

Past winners

References

Recurring sporting events established in 1999
1999 establishments in Italy
UCI Women's Road World Cup
Cycle races in Italy
Recurring sporting events disestablished in 2005
Defunct cycling races in Italy
Sport in Liguria
2006 disestablishments in Italy

es:Milán-San Remo#Primavera Rosa